Robert Jefferson Hargrove, Junior (October 3, 1937 – May 19, 2005) was the second bishop of the Episcopal Diocese of Western Louisiana.

Early Life and Education
Hargrove was born on October 3, 1937 in Paducah, Kentucky to Robert Jefferson Hargrove Senior and Mildred Alice Copley, and was raised as a Baptist. He as educated at Paducah Tilghman High School and later studied at Georgetown College from where he earned a Bachelor in Music Education. He married Linda Hargrove on December 29, 1957 and together had three children. Later he earned a Master of Divinity from the Central Baptist Theological Seminary in Kansas in 1965 and subsequently ministered at the DeSoto Baptist Church in DeSoto in De Soto, Kansas. During that time he joined the Episcopal Church and commenced studies at the Seabury-Western Theological Seminary from where he graduated in 1967.

Ordained Ministry 
Hargrove was ordained to the diaconate in June 1967 and to the priesthood in December 1967 in Trinity Cathedral, Davenport, Iowa. He was then appointed assistant to the dean of Trinity Cathedral. After a while he moved to West Palm Beach, Florida to serve as associate rector of Holy Trinity Church. Later he also became rector of St Andrew's Church in Grand Prairie, Texas and Canon to the Ordinary. He was also rector of Grace Church in Madison, Wisconsin and in 1980 became rector of Grace Church in Monroe, Louisiana. Between 1987 and 1989 he served as rector of the Church Ascension in Lafayette, Louisiana.

Bishop
During a special convention of the Diocese of Western Louisiana held on March 13, 1989, Hargrove was elected its Coadjutor Bishop. He was consecrated as a bishop on July 8, 1989 by Presiding Bishop Edmond L. Browning. He succeeded as diocesan bishop on July 7, 1990 and duly installed at St Mark's Cathedral in Shreveport, Louisiana. Hargrove retired on November 1, 2001. After a lengthily illness, he died on May 19, 2005 at his home in Pineville, Louisiana.

References

Sources
 Episcopal Church Annual

1934 births
2005 deaths
People from Paducah, Kentucky
20th-century American Episcopalians
Episcopal bishops of Western Louisiana
20th-century American clergy
Converts to Anglicanism from Baptist denominations